Gymnomyzinae is a subfamily of shore flies in the family Ephydridae.

Genera
Tribe Discocerinini  Cresson, 1925
Aquachasma Zatwarnicki, 2016
Diclasiopa Hendel, 1917
Discocerina Macquart, 1835
Ditrichophora Cresson, 1924
Gymnoclasiopa Hendel, 1930
Hecamedoides Hendel, 1917
Lamproclasiopa Hendel, 1933
 Pectinifer  Cresson, 1944
Polytrichophora Cresson, 1924
Tribe Gastropini
Beckeriella Williston, 1897
Gastrops Williston, 1897
Tribe Gymnomyzini Latreille
Athyroglossa Loew, 1860
Cerometopum  Cresson, 1914
Chaetomosillus Hendel, 1934
Chlorichaeta Becker, 1922
Gymnopiella  Cresson, 1945
Hoploaegis  Cresson, 1944
Mosillus Latreille, 1804
Placopsidella Kertész, 1901
Platygymnopa Wirth, 1971
Stratiothyrea Meijere, 1913
Trimerogastra Hendel, 1914
Tribe Hecamedini Mathis 1991
Allotrichoma Becker, 1896
Diphuia  Cresson, 1944
Elephantinosoma Becker, 1903
Eremotrichoma Giordani Soika, 1956
Hecamede Haliday in Curtis, 1837
Tribe Lipochaetini
Glenanthe Haliday, 1839
Tribe Ochtherini Dahl
Ochthera Latreille, 1802

References

Ephydridae
Brachycera subfamilies